"Listen with Your Heart" is a song written by Diane Warren, and recorded by CeCe Winans for her second album Everlasting Love (1998).

Casey Donovan version

In 2004, the song was chosen to be released as the winner's single of the second series of Australian Idol. The song was performed in the penultimate episode by the season's Top 2 finalists, Anthony Callea and Casey Donovan. On November 16, Donovan was announced as the winner, and the song was released on 29 November 2004. It debuted at number-one on the ARIA Charts, where it remained for two weeks. It was later included in her first album For You (2004).

Track listing
 "Listen With Your Heart" – 4:03
 "Nothing Else Matters	" (live) – 2:01

Charts

Weekly charts

Year-end charts

Certifications

Other versions
 In 1999, Italian singer Giorgia made a cover of this song: Parlami d'amore.

References

1998 songs
2004 debut singles
Casey Donovan (singer) songs
CeCe Winans songs
Sony BMG singles
Number-one singles in Australia
Songs written by Diane Warren